The Adventure Mine is a copper mine in Greenland Township, near Greenland, Michigan in Ontonagon County, Michigan that operated from 1850 to 1920. The mine has five shafts. It is open for tours from late May to mid-October, under the operation of the Adventure Mining Company.

History

1850 to 1920
In 1850, the Adventure Mining Company (unrelated to present company) was formed and operated a mine until 1862. In 1863, it was purchased by Thomas Mason and named the Adventure Copper Company. Starting in 1898, the property was operated by the Adventure Consolidated Copper Company. Production ceased in 1908 due to low copper prices, but restarted for a short time during World War I. Production finally halted in 1917 and the mine closed in 1920.

1970 to present
Beginning in the 1970s, tours have been available on and off. Jack and Margaret Neph purchased the mine in 1972 and offered tours from 1973 through the mid-1980s. Their son John, along with his wife Winnie, offered tours from the late 1990s until 2003. The current owners, the modern Adventure Mining Company owned by Matthew and Victoria Portfleet, purchased the mine in 2004 and have operated tours since 2005.

Since 2009, an annual bike race called Miner's Revenge has been held whose course runs both within the mine and above ground.

See also
 Copper mining in Michigan
 List of Copper Country mines

References

External links
 Adventure Mine Tours

Copper mines in Michigan
Geography of Ontonagon County, Michigan
Underground mines in the United States
Buildings and structures in Ontonagon County, Michigan
Tourist attractions in Ontonagon County, Michigan
Keweenaw National Historical Park
1850 establishments in Michigan
Museums in Ontonagon County, Michigan
Mining museums in Michigan